Joseph Albert Taffoni (March 27, 1945 – July 26, 2021) was a former American football offensive lineman who played six seasons in the National Football League with the Cleveland Browns and New York Giants. He was drafted by the Cleveland Browns in the fourth round of the 1967 NFL Draft. He first enrolled at West Virginia University before transferring to the University of Tennessee at Martin. Taffoni attended Carmichaels High School in Carmichaels, Pennsylvania.

References

External links
Just Sports Stats

1945 births
2021 deaths
Players of American football from Pennsylvania
American football offensive linemen
West Virginia Mountaineers football players
UT Martin Skyhawks football players
Cleveland Browns players
New York Giants players
People from Brownsville, Pennsylvania